Mecaspis alternans is a species of cylindrical weevils belonging to the family Curculionidae.

Description 
The body is elongate shape, with a dark brown or greyish basic color.

Distribution 
This genus is present in most of Europe, in the Near East and in North Africa.

References 

 Biolib
 Fauna Europaea
 Catalogue of Life
 Photo of Mecaspis alternans

External links 

Lixinae
Beetles described in 1795